Amistad is a 1997 American historical drama film directed by Steven Spielberg, based on the events in 1839 aboard the Spanish slave ship La Amistad, during which Mende tribesmen abducted for the slave trade managed to gain control of their captors' ship off the coast of Cuba, and the international legal battle that followed their capture by the Washington, a U.S. revenue cutter. The case was ultimately resolved by the U.S. Supreme Court in 1841.

Morgan Freeman, Anthony Hopkins, Djimon Hounsou, and Matthew McConaughey had starring roles. David Franzoni's screenplay was based on the 1987 book Mutiny on the Amistad: The Saga of a Slave Revolt and Its Impact on American Abolition, Law, and Diplomacy, by professor Howard Jones.

The film received largely positive critical reviews and grossed over $58 million worldwide.

Plot

The schooner La Amistad is transporting black slaves off the coast of the Spanish colony of Cuba in 1839. A captive, Cinqué, leads an uprising against the crew, most of whom are killed. Two navigators, Pedro Montez and Jose Ruiz, are spared on condition they help sail the ship to Africa. The Spaniards predictably betray them and instead sail into US waters, where the ship is stopped by the U.S. revenue cutter Washington, and the mutineers are arrested.

A complicated legal battle ensues over the slaves. United States Attorney William S. Holabird brings charges of piracy and murder against them, but they are simultaneously claimed as property both by Montez & Ruiz, and as salvage by two officers from the Washington. The Spanish government of Queen Isabella intervenes in support of Montez & Ruiz, under the Treaty of San Lorenzo. To avoid a diplomatic incident, President Martin Van Buren directs his Secretary of State John Forsyth to support the Spanish claim. Meanwhile, abolitionist Lewis Tappan and his black associate Theodore Joadson (a former slave), resolve to help the captives. They approach the brilliant lawyer, former US president and serving U.S. representative John Quincy Adams, but he is reluctant to get involved. They instead hire the young and eccentric attorney Roger Sherman Baldwin.

Baldwin, unable to converse directly with his clients due to the language barrier, suspects the slaves are not Cubans but Africans who have been kidnapped and transported illegally as part of the banned transatlantic slave trade. He and Joadson search La Amistad and find documents which prove the captives were kidnapped from Sierra Leone and transported across the Atlantic aboard the Portuguese slave ship Tecora before being transferred to La Amistad in Havana. The judge is impressed and signals his intention to dismiss the US and Spanish governments' case and release the captives.

To preclude this possibility, Van Buren replaces the judge with a younger man, Coglin, whom he believes will be easier to manipulate. Joadson seeks advice from Adams, who tells him that court cases are usually won by the side with the best 'story'. Baldwin and Joadson recruit freedman James Covey as a translator, enabling Cinqué to testify directly before the court. He describes how he was kidnapped from his home, and the horrors of the Middle Passage. Baldwin calls Captain Fitzgerald of the Royal Navy's West Africa Squadron to corroborate Cinqué's testimony. He speculates that the captives were taken aboard the Tecora at the notorious slave fort Lomboko. Under cross-examination, Fitzgerald admits there is no direct evidence of Lomboko's existence. As tension rises, Cinqué abruptly stands and demands, "Give us, us free!". Moved by Cinqué's emotion, Judge Coglin rules that the Africans are to be released, and that Montez & Ruiz are to be arrested and charged with illegal slave-trading.

Under pressure from Senator John C. Calhoun of South Carolina, who represents the slave-holding interests of the American South, Van Buren appeals the case to the Supreme Court. Baldwin and Joadson visit Adams again, and after meeting Cinqué he agrees to represent the Africans before the Supreme Court. Adams' impassioned and eloquent speech convinces the court to confirm the judgement and release the Africans.

Lomboko is stormed by Royal Marines under the command of Captain Fitzgerald, and the slaves held there are freed. Fitzgerald orders the ship's cannon to destroy the fortress, and dictates a sardonic letter to Forsyth saying that he was correct — the infamous slave fort does not now exist.

Van Buren is discredited by his failure to prevent the release of the Africans, and loses the 1840 election to William Henry Harrison. The Spanish government continues to press its claim for compensation up until the American Civil War.

Cinqué returns to Africa, but is unable to reunite with his family due to civil war in Sierra Leone.

Cast

 Djimon Hounsou as Sengbe Pieh / Joseph Cinqué
 Matthew McConaughey as Roger Sherman Baldwin
 Anthony Hopkins as John Quincy Adams
 Morgan Freeman as Theodore Joadson
 Nigel Hawthorne as President Martin Van Buren
 David Paymer as Secretary of State John Forsyth
 Pete Postlethwaite as William S. Holabird
 Stellan Skarsgård as Lewis Tappan
 Razaaq Adoti as Yamba
 Abu Bakaar Fofanah as Fala
 Anna Paquin as Queen Isabella II of Spain
 Tomas Milian as Ángel Calderón de la Barca y Belgrano
 Chiwetel Ejiofor as Ensign James Covey
 Derrick Ashong as Buakei
 Geno Silva as Jose Ruiz
 John Ortiz as Pedro Montes
 Kevin J. O'Connor as Missionary
 Ralph Brown as Lieutenant Thomas R. Gedney
 Darren E. Burrows as Lieutenant Richard W. Meade
 Allan Rich as Judge Andrew T. Judson
 Paul Guilfoyle as Attorney
 Peter Firth as Captain Charles Fitzgerald
 Xander Berkeley as Ledger Hammond
 Jeremy Northam as Judge Coglin
 Arliss Howard as John C. Calhoun
 Austin Pendleton as Professor Josiah Willard Gibbs Sr.
 Pedro Armendáriz Jr. as General Baldomero Espartero

Casting
In casting the role of Joseph Cinqué, Spielberg had strict requirements that the actor must have an impressive physical appearance, be able to command authority and be of West African descent. The actor who secured the role would also need to learn the Mende accent spoken by Cinqué. Cuba Gooding Jr. was offered the role but turned it down and later regretted it. Dustin Hoffman was offered a role but turned it down, while Will Smith and musician Seal both tried to secure the part. Despite open auditions being held in London, Paris and Sierra Leone, the role remained unfilled with just nine weeks before filming was due to start. Spielberg was prepared to delay production by up to two years if he could not find the right actor. After considering over 150 actors, Spielberg watched the audition tape of relatively unknown actor Djimon Hounsou reading a speech from the film's script. After Hounsou read the speech in English, Goun and further learned it in Mende, Spielberg was impressed enough that he cast him in the role of Cinqué. Hounsou auditioned with the hope of landing just a small role and said he was not aware of the story before securing the role. He read numerous books on the rebellion and subsequent trial to aquaint himself with events portrayed in the film.

Morgan Freeman was cast on a first-hired basis as Theodore Joadson, one of the film's few fictional characters who was a composite representation of African American abolitionists in the Nineteenth Century. Actor and film director Spike Lee is believed to have been offered, and declined, the role. After Freeman turned down the role of Ensign James Covey, choosing to play the character of Joadson instead, Chiwetel Ejiofor, while a student at the London Academy of Music and Dramatic Art, made his film debut in the role, having auditioned for it while playing Othello at the Royal National Theatre in London.

Retired U.S. Supreme Court Justice Harry Blackmun also appears in the film as Justice Joseph Story. Blackmun was honored to appear in the movie, acknowledging it was a "significant film about our nation's struggle with slavery".

Production
Djimon Hounsou had just 10 days to learn the Mende dialect spoken by his character and despite both being West African, there was little similarity to Hounsou's native Benin dialect. Hounsou was not able to learn all his lines in Mende and those he could not were broken down and spoken phonetically, except for the most important scenes which he knew he needed to understand every word being spoken. He said that among the most hated aspects of the film was being locked in real chains and shackles, which made him feel like quitting on the first day.

Filming
Filming locations included Mystic Seaport, which doubled as New Haven. Film crews spent four days there and employed around 300 extras Numerous scenes were filmed in Newport, Rhode Island. Many courthouse scenes were shot in the Old Colony House, while the prison scenes were shot within Fort Adams.

During the scene where the characters Joseph Cinqué and John Quincy Adams meet for the first time, actors Hounsou and Hopkins "struggled through take after take, trying not to cry", and had to be continually told by Spielberg to hold back the tears as it wasn't appropriate for that moment in the scene. Hopkins reportedly wept once the scene was completed.

Post production
The entire film was completed in 51 days and cost around $39 million. Prior to release, a legal battle ensued between Spielberg's DreamWorks Pictures and novelist Barbara Chase-Riboud, the latter who claimed that specific details from her 1989 novel Echo of Lions were lifted for the screenplay. Chase-Riboud filed a $10 million lawsuit of copyright infringement.

Soundtrack

Music

The musical score for Amistad was composed by John Williams. A soundtrack album was released on December 9, 1997 by DreamWorks Records.

Historical accuracy
Many academics, including Columbia University professor Eric Foner, have criticized Amistad for historical inaccuracy and the misleading characterizations of the Amistad case as a "turning point" in the American perspective on slavery. Foner wrote, "In fact, the Amistad case revolved around the Atlantic slave trade — by 1840 outlawed by international treaty — and had nothing whatsoever to do with slavery as a domestic institution. Incongruous as it may seem, it was perfectly possible in the nineteenth century to condemn the importation of slaves from Africa while simultaneously defending slavery and the flourishing slave trade within the United States... Amistad’s problems go far deeper than such anachronisms as President Martin Van Buren campaigning for re-election on a whistle-stop train tour (in 1840, candidates did not campaign), or people constantly talking about the impending Civil War, which lay 20 years in the future."

Reception

Critical response
Amistad received mainly positive reviews. On Rotten Tomatoes, the film has an approval rating of 78% based on reviews from 67 critics, with an average score of 6.9/10. Its consensus reads, "Heartfelt without resorting to preachiness, Amistad tells an important story with engaging sensitivity and absorbing skill." Metacritic calculated an average score of 63 out of 100 based on 23 reviews, indicating "generally favorable reviews". Audiences polled by CinemaScore gave the film an average grade of "A-" on an A+ to F scale.

Susan Wloszczyna of USA Today summed up the feelings of many reviewers when she wrote, "as Spielberg vehicles go, Amistad — part mystery, action thriller, courtroom drama, even culture-clash comedy — lands between the disturbing lyricism of Schindler's List and the storybook artificiality of The Color Purple." Roger Ebert awarded the film three out of four stars, writing: 

In 2014, the movie was one of several discussed by Noah Berlatsky in The Atlantic in an article concerning white savior narratives in film, calling it "sanctimonious drivel."

Morgan Freeman is very proud of the movie, having said, "I loved the film. I really did. I had a moment of err, during the killings. I thought that was a little over-wrought. But [Spielberg] wanted to make a point and I understood that."

Box office
The film debuted at  3 on Wednesday, December 10, 1997. It earned $44,229,441 at the box office in the United States.

Awards and honors
Amistad was nominated for Academy Awards in four categories: Best Supporting Actor (Anthony Hopkins), Best Original Dramatic Score (John Williams), Best Cinematography (Janusz Kamiński), and Best Costume Design (Ruth E. Carter).

Other cultural significance 
The United States Department of State and the Instituto Cubano del Arte e Industria Cinematográficos (ICAIC) collaborated in 1998 to screen Amistad as part of an effort to increase "cultural diplomacy" built around shared national histories of racial struggles in the United States and Cuba.

See also

 List of films featuring slavery
 Supreme Court of the United States in fiction
 Trial film

Footnotes

References

External links

 
 
 
 
 

 Amistad at Virtual History

Amistad (film)
1997 films
1997 drama films
1990s American films
1990s English-language films
1990s historical drama films
1990s legal drama films
American courtroom films
American historical drama films
American legal drama films
Cultural depictions of Isabella II of Spain
Cultural depictions of John Quincy Adams
Cultural depictions of Martin Van Buren
DreamWorks Pictures films
Films about American politicians
Films about American slavery
Films about diplomacy
Films about interpreting and translation
Films about lawyers
Films about mutinies
Films about presidents of the United States
Films directed by Steven Spielberg
Films produced by Steven Spielberg
Films scored by John Williams
Films set in 1839
Films set in 1840
Films set in 1841
Films set in Boston
Films set in the British Empire
Films set in Connecticut
Films set in Cuba
Films set in New York (state)
Films set in Sierra Leone
Films set in Spain
Films set in Washington, D.C.
Films shot in Connecticut
Films shot in Massachusetts
Films shot in Rhode Island
Films set on ships
HBO Films films
Mende-language films
Military courtroom films